Minuscule 900 (in the Gregory-Aland numbering), ε 386 (von Soden), is a 13th-century Greek minuscule manuscript of the New Testament on parchment. It has marginalia. The manuscript has survived in complete condition.

Description 

The codex contains the text of the four Gospels, on 288 parchment leaves (size ), with some lacunae. The text is written in one column per page, 22 lines per page.
It contains also liturgical books with hagiographies: Synaxarion and Menologion.

There is also a division according to the smaller Ammonian Sections (in Mark 234 sections, the last section in Mark 16:9), whose numbers are given at the margin, with references to the Eusebian Canons (written below Ammonian Section numbers).

Text 
The Greek text of the codex is a representative of the Byzantine. Hermann von Soden classified it to the textual family Kx. Kurt Aland placed it in Category V.

According to the Claremont Profile Method it represents the textual family Kx in Luke 1 and Luke 20. In Luke 10 no profile was made. It creates a textual cluster with a manuscript 202.

History 

According to C. R. Gregory it was written in the 13th or 14th-century. Currently the manuscript is dated by the INTF to the 13th century. It was presented by a Greek priest in 1784 to A. F. Stierzenbecker, who gave it to the University Library in Uppsala. Gregory saw it in 1891.

The manuscript was added to the list of New Testament manuscripts by Scrivener (614e) and Gregory (900e).

It is not cited in critical editions of the Greek New Testament (UBS4, NA28).

The manuscript is housed at the Uppsala University Library (Gr. 9) in Uppsala.

See also 

 List of New Testament minuscules (1–1000)
 Biblical manuscript
 Textual criticism

References

Further reading

External links 
 

Greek New Testament minuscules
13th-century biblical manuscripts
Uppsala University